Second Lieutenant Stanley Henry Parry Boughey VC (9 April 1896 – 4 December 1917) was a British Army officer and a British recipient of the Victoria Cross (VC), the highest and most prestigious award for gallantry in the face of the enemy that can be awarded to British and Commonwealth forces.

Boughey was born in Liverpool on 9 April 1896 and was brought up in Blackpool. He was 21 years old, and a second lieutenant in the 1/4th Battalion, The Royal Scots Fusiliers, British Army during the First World War. He was awarded the VC for his actions on 1 December 1917 at El Burj, Palestine, against the Ottoman Army. He was wounded committing the act, and died three days later, on 4 December.

Citation

Boughey was interred at the Gaza War Cemetery.

See also
 List of Scottish Victoria Cross recipients

References

 Monuments to Courage (David Harvey, 1999)
 The Register of the Victoria Cross (This England, 1997)
 Scotland's Forgotten Valour (Graham Ross, 1995)

External links
 Hunting for heroes in resort's past
 Salute to a hero

1896 births
1917 deaths
People from Toxteth
British World War I recipients of the Victoria Cross
Victoria Cross awardees from Liverpool
British military personnel killed in World War I
Royal Scots Fusiliers officers
British Army recipients of the Victoria Cross
British Army personnel of World War I
Burials at Gaza War Cemetery
Military personnel from Liverpool